Gertrude "Traute or Trude" Kleinová (born in Brno, Czechoslovakia; August 13, 1918 – April 9, 1976) was a three-time world champion table tennis player, winning the women's team world championship twice, and the world mixed doubles once.

She and her first husband were deported by the Nazis to the Theresienstadt concentration camp and eventually sent to the Auschwitz concentration camp, where her husband was killed.  She was posthumously inducted into the International Jewish Sports Hall of Fame.

Early life
Kleinová was Jewish, and was a member of the Maccabi Club of Brno.

Table tennis career
Kleinová was a member of the Czech national table tennis team that won the 1935 and 1936 Women's World Table Tennis Championships (the Corbillon Cup).  At the 1935 championships in Wembley, England, she advanced to the quarterfinals in singles, doubles, and mixed doubles.

In March 1936, she also teamed with Miloslav Hamr to win the gold medal in the Mixed Doubles 10th World Table Tennis Championships in Prague.  In the competition they defeated Americans Buddy Blattner and Jay Purves in the preliminaries, as they won 21–19 in the fifth game.

In the Women's Doubles in 1936, Kleinová and Jindra Holoubkova-Juarez lost to Americans World Champion Ruth Aarons and Jay Purves in the quarter-finals, losing 21–19 in the fourth game.  In singles, she advanced as far as the round of 32.

In 1937, in the Mixed Doubles at the World Table Tennis Championships in Baden, Austria, Americans Abe Berenbaum and Emily Fuller upset the defending champions Kleinová and Hamr in the round of 32, by a score of −11, −15, 5, 19, 15.  She also lost in the round of 16 in both singles and Women's Doubles.

Kleinová married Jacob Schalinger, the Chairman of her table tennis division, in 1939.

Concentration camps, and later life
Kleinová and her husband, as well as her coach Eric Vogel, were deported by the Nazis to the Theresienstadt concentration camp in December 1941.  Each was eventually sent to the Auschwitz concentration camp.  She and Vogel survived, but her husband was killed.

She later married Vogel.  After World War II concluded, in 1948 Kleinová and Vogel emigrated to the United States.  She died of cancer in 1976.

Hall of Fame
In 1994, Kleinová was inducted into the International Jewish Sports Hall of Fame.

See also
List of victims and survivors of Auschwitz
World Table Tennis Championships
 List of select Jewish table tennis players

References

External links
Jewish Sports bio

1918 births
1975 deaths
Czech Jews
Sportspeople from Brno
Jewish table tennis players
Czech female table tennis players
Czechoslovak table tennis players
Czechoslovak emigrants to the United States
Auschwitz concentration camp survivors
Theresienstadt Ghetto survivors